The Roman Catholic Archdiocese of Lanzhou is a Latin Metropolitan Archdiocese of the Catholic church with an Ecclesiastical province, yet depends on the missionary Roman Congregation for the Evangelization of Peoples.

Its archiepiscopal see is the Cathedral of the Sacred Heart located in the city of Lanzhou, Gansu province. No statistics available.

Ecclesiastical province 
The Metropolitan's Suffragan sees are :
 Roman Catholic Diocese of Pingliang
 Roman Catholic Diocese of Qinzhou

History 
 Established on 21 June 1878 as Apostolic Vicariate of Kan-su, on territory split off from the then Apostolic Vicariate of Central Shensi
 Renamed on 28 April 1905 as Apostolic Vicariate of Northern Kansu, having lost territory to establish the then Apostolic Vicariate of Southern Kansu
 March 8, 1922: Renamed as Apostolic Vicariate of Western Kansu, having (re)gained territory from its above daughter Apostolic Vicariate of Southern Kansu
 3 December 1924: Renamed as Apostolic Vicariate of Lanchowfu
 Lost territories again : on 1930.02.14 to establish the Mission sui juris of Xinjiang and on 1937.02.04 to establish the Apostolic Prefecture of Xining
 Promoted on 11 April 1946 as Metropolitan Archdiocese of Lanzhou

Episcopal ordinaries
(all Roman rite) 

Apostolic Vicar of Kan-su
 Ferdinand Hubertus Hamer, Scheutists (C.I.C.M.) (born Netherlands) (1878.06.21–1888.08.30), Titular Bishop of Tremithus (1878.06.21–1900.07.15), next Apostolic Vicar of Southwestern Mongolia (China) (1888.08.30–death 1900.07.15)

Apostolic Vicars of Northern Kansu
 Hubertus Otto, C.I.C.M. (born Belgium) (June 20, 1890–retired 1918), Titular Bishop of Assuras (1890.06.20–death 1938.02.25)
 Godfried Frederix, C.I.C.M. (born The Netherlands) (March 5, 1920–March 14, 1922), Titular Bishop of Thagaste (1920.03.08–1938.06.18), next Apostolic Vicar of Ningxia (China) (1922.03.14–retired 1930.03.21), died 1938

Apostolic Vicar  of Western Kansu
 Theodor Buddenbrock, S.V.D. (born Germany) (November 25, 1924–3 December 1924 see below), Titular Bishop of Issus (1924.11.25–1946.04.11)

Apostolic Vicar  of Lanchowfu
 Theodor Buddenbrock, S.V.D. (see above 3 December 1924–April 11, 1946 see below)

Metropolitan Archbishops of Lanzhou
 Theodor Buddenbrock, S.V.D. (see above April 11, 1946–death  January 18, 1959)
 Philip Yang Libo (first native incumbent) (1981–death 15 February 1998)–clandestine consecration 1981
 Joseph Han Zhihai (2003–present).

See also 

 List of Catholic dioceses in China

References

Sources and external links 
 GCatholic.org with Google satellite photo - data for all sections

 Catholic Hierarchy

Roman Catholic dioceses in China
Religious organizations established in 1878
Roman Catholic dioceses and prelatures established in the 19th century
Religion in Gansu